Sigsbee Park, also known as Dredgers Key, is an island about half a mile (800 m) north of Key West island in the lower Florida Keys; administratively it is within the City of Key West, Florida, United States.

It is connected to the island of Key West by Sigsbee Road.  The island and causeway are part of the Key West Naval Air Station.  It is primarily used for Navy housing.  It also includes a Navy Exchange, commissary, elementary school, Morale, Welfare and Recreation, youth center, child development center, recreation center, RV park, veterinary clinic and Sunset Lounge bar & grill.

History
The island was created in the 1940s from dredge spoil following the construction of Navy seaplane runways supporting the former seaplane base at nearby Trumbo Point.

Demographics
Sigsbee Park has just over 500 housing units.  The units house a mix of military personnel and civilian base personnel.
It no longer has a veterinary clinic which closed several years ago.  Only Military I.D.'s, or other authorized personnel can enter and the proper ID is needed to make purchases at the Commissary and NEX.  It no longer has a chapel or Arts and Crafts center. The office has been moved to ITT building.

Education
Sigsbee Park is served by the Monroe County School District. Its zoned schools are Sigsbee Elementary School on Sigsbee Park and Horace O'Bryant Middle School, and Key West High School  on Key West island.

References

Neighborhoods in Key West, Florida
Islands of Monroe County, Florida
Islands of the Florida Keys
Islands of Florida